Pillsbury, also spelled Pilsbury, is a surname. Notable people with the name include:

People
 Albert E. Pillsbury (1849–1930), American lawyer and politician
 Arthur Clarence Pillsbury (1870–1946), American photographer
 Charles Alfred Pillsbury (1842–1899), founder of C.A. Pillsbury and Company (later Pillsbury Company)
 Edward Pilsbury (1824–1882), 38th mayor of New Orleans
 George A. Pillsbury (1816–1898), businessman and miller associated with the formation of the Pillsbury Company
 George S. Pillsbury (1925–2012) American businessman and politician
 Gilbert Pillsbury (1813–1893), Reconstruction mayor of Charleston, South Carolina
 Harry Nelson Pillsbury (1872–1906), American chess player
 John E. Pillsbury (1846–1919), United States Navy rear admiral
 John S. Pillsbury (1827–1901), Governor of Minnesota
 Mary Pillsbury Weston (1817-1895), American painter
 Matthew Pillsbury (born 1973), American photographer
 Michael Pillsbury (born 1945), American director of the Center on Chinese Strategy and author
 Parker Pillsbury (1809–1898), American abolitionist
 Philip W. Pillsbury (1903–1984), American chairman emeritus of the Pillsbury Company and a grandson of the cofounder
 Sam Pillsbury, American film director and producer
 Timothy Pilsbury (1789–1858), American politician
 Walter Bowers Pillsbury (1872–1960), American psychologist
 Wilmot Pilsbury (1840–1908), English watercolourist and art teacher

Fictional characters
 Emma Pillsbury, Glee character
 Rose Pillsbury, Glee character
 Rusty Pillsbury, Glee character